Sisurcana pululahuana is a species of moth of the family Tortricidae. It is found in Pichincha Province, Ecuador.

The wingspan is about 20 mm. The ground colour of the forewings is brownish cream with brownish suffusions and venation. The colour is creamer at one-third of the costa. The markings are dark brown. The hindwings are brownish, darker in the posterior half.

Etymology
The species name refers to the type locality, the dormant volcano Pululagua.

References

Moths described in 2009
Sisurcana
Moths of South America
Taxa named by Józef Razowski